The canton of Auneau is an administrative division of the Eure-et-Loir department, northern France. Its borders were modified at the French canton reorganisation which came into effect in March 2015. Its seat is in Auneau-Bleury-Saint-Symphorien.

It consists of the following communes:
 
Ardelu
Aunay-sous-Auneau
Auneau-Bleury-Saint-Symphorien
Bailleau-Armenonville
Béville-le-Comte
Champseru
La Chapelle-d'Aunainville
Châtenay
Denonville
Écrosnes
Francourville
Gallardon
Garancières-en-Beauce
Le Gué-de-Longroi
Houville-la-Branche
Léthuin
Levainville
Maisons
Moinville-la-Jeulin
Mondonville-Saint-Jean
Morainville
Oinville-sous-Auneau
Oysonville
Roinville
Saint-Léger-des-Aubées
Sainville
Santeuil
Umpeau
Vierville
Voise
Yermenonville
Ymeray

References

Cantons of Eure-et-Loir